The Treaty of Chaumont was a series of separately-signed but identically-worded agreements in 1814 between the Austrian Empire, the Kingdom of Prussia, the Russian Empire and the United Kingdom. They were dated 1 March 1814, although the actual signings took place on 9 or 19 March. The treaty was intended to draw the powers of the Sixth Coalition into a closer alliance in case France rejected the peace terms they had recently offered. Each power agreed to put 150,000 soldiers in the field against France and to guarantee for twenty years the European peace (once obtained) against French aggression.

Following discussions in late February 1814, representatives of Austria, Prussia, Russia, and the United Kingdom reconvened a meeting at Chaumont, Haute-Marne, on 1 March 1814. The resulting Treaty of Chaumont was signed on 9 or 19 March 1814 although it was dated 1 March by Emperor Alexander I, Emperor Francis II (with Metternich), King Frederick William III, and British Foreign Secretary Viscount Castlereagh. The treaty called for Napoleon to give up all conquests and thus to revert France to its pre-revolutionary borders in exchange for a ceasefire. If Napoleon rejected the treaty, the Allies pledged to continue the war. If Napoleon accepted, he would be allowed to continue to rule as the Emperor of the French and to keep a dynasty. The following day, Napoleon rejected the treaty, which ended his last chance of a negotiated settlement.

The decisions were again ratified and put into effect by the Congress of Vienna of 1814–1815. The terms were largely written by Lord Castlereagh, the British foreign minister, who offered cash subsidies to keep the other armies in the field against Napoleon. Key terms included the establishment of a confederated Germany, the division of Italy into independent states, the restoration of the Bourbon kings of Spain and the enlargement of the Netherlands to include what in 1830 became Belgium. The treaty became the cornerstone of the alliance that formed the European balance of power for decades.

See also 
 Holy Alliance
 Concert of Europe

Notes

References 

 
 
  — advanced diplomatic history online

Chaumont
Chaumont
Chaumont
1814 in the Austrian Empire
1814 in France
Chaumont
Treaties of the First French Empire
Chaumont
1814 in Prussia
1814 in the Russian Empire
1814 in the United Kingdom
Haute-Marne
1814 treaties
1814 in British law
March 1814 events
Francis II, Holy Roman Emperor
Alexander I of Russia